Arnold Friedman (February 23, 1879 – December 29, 1946) was an American Modernist painter.

Life 

He was born in Corona, Queens, worked for the Federal Art Project and studied at the Art Students League of New York under the tutelage of Robert Henri and Kenneth Hayes Miller. In 1909, he took a six-month leave of absence from his job to study art in Paris. During this time, he was introduced to the styles of Impressionism and Cubism. He exhibited with many of the most avant-garde venues and dealers of the period, including the Society of Independent Artists.

Friedman painted the mural Rice Growing at the Kingstree, South Carolina post office with the help of New Deal funds in 1940. His painting Landscape has been on display at the Albright-Knox Gallery in Buffalo, New York. He also competed in the art competitions at the 1932 Summer Olympics.

References

Further reading 

1879 births
1946 deaths
Students of Robert Henri
Modern painters
People from Corona, Queens
19th-century American painters
American male painters
20th-century American painters
Painters from New York City
Art Students League of New York alumni
American muralists
Section of Painting and Sculpture artists
Olympic competitors in art competitions
19th-century American male artists
20th-century American male artists